This is a list of songs recorded by R. Kelly.

Songs

Collaborations

Features

See also
 List of unreleased songs recorded by R. Kelly

References

R. Kelly songs
Kelly, R